Agaronia johnkochi is a species of sea snail, a marine gastropod mollusk in the family Olividae, the olives.

Description
The length of the shell varies between 25 mm and 40 mm.

Distribution
This marine species occurs off Java, Indonesia.

References

External links
 

Olividae
Gastropods described in 1990